Fire Station No. 5 in Roanoke, Virginia is a former fire station at 216 12th Street NW, in the independent city of Roanoke. The neighborhood fire station was one of three built in 1911, and was designed to look like a house, blending into its residential neighborhood.  It housed one of the city's first fire trucks to be powered by an internal combustion engine.  It served the city as a fire station until 2010, when it was turned over to a local nonprofit organization.

The building was listed on the National Register of Historic Places in 2011 as City of Roanoke Fire Station No. 5.

See also
National Register of Historic Places listings in Roanoke, Virginia

References

Fire stations completed in 1911
Fire stations on the National Register of Historic Places in Virginia
Defunct fire stations in Virginia
Buildings and structures in Roanoke, Virginia
National Register of Historic Places in Roanoke, Virginia
1911 establishments in Virginia